The 2017 ICC World Cricket League Asia Region Division One was an international cricket tournament that took place in Chiang Mai, Thailand. The teams competing in the tournament were hosts Thailand, Bhutan, Bahrain, China, Kuwait, Qatar and Saudi Arabia. The winner of the qualifier progressed to ICC WCL Division 5 which was staged in September 2017.

Teams 
Seven teams invited by ICC for the tournament:

Points table 

Source: Cricinfo

References 

2017–19 ICC World Cricket League
2017 in cricket